Mainichi Issho (まいにちいっしょ, Mainichi Issho which translates as "Every Day Together") is a November 11, 2006 Sony Computer Entertainment online game for the PlayStation 3. It is based on the Doko Demo Issyo franchise, starring the video game character Toro who is the mascot for SCEJ. This game is exclusively for the Japanese market. Its international title is Everyday Together ! as seen romanized in the Mainichi Issho Store. A PlayStation Portable port called Mainichi Issho Portable was released on October 15, 2008 and a sequel to the very first Dokodemo Issho game (Which was released on the PS1) titled Toro to Morimori was released on the PlayStation 3 on July 23, 2009.

Mainichi Issho was eventually discontinued on November 11, 2009 and replaced with Weekly Toro Station.

History
Mainichi Issho is part of the Together Everywhere! (Doko Demo Issyo) game series that revolves around the anthropomorphic cat Toro Inoue. Episodes spawned on the PlayStation series of home and handleheld consoles starting in 1999 with the original PlayStation. Since then various sequels and sidestories were released including on Windows systems and cell phones such as the imode. Even though the franchise is popular in Japan and known in South-East Asia, no game had a western release yet.

Mainichi Issho is the 12th game in the series and was made available for free download on the Japanese PlayStation Store on the PlayStation 3's launch date in November 2006. It is preceded and followed by two cell phone games.

Characters
 — a white cat which is the main character of Mainichi Issho.
 — a black cat («kuro» means «black» in Japanese), Toro's best friend and a rival. He first appeared in the series on the PlayStation 2 episode.
 — an American-Japanese rose rabbit and a friend of the main character.
 — a four-face metallic robot and a friend of Toro.
 — a green frog and Toro's friend.
 — a French-Japanese brown dog who is a francophile and a friend of Toro.

Game modes
Mainichi Issho includes various features coming from different genres, from news to mini-games to online communication to artificial life which makes it an original crossgenre game. Though SCEJ marketed it as a "casual net" (お気軽ネット) genre game. Among its more noticeable innovations are real time screenshot capture, in-game XMB access (Friend, Internet browser, BGM selection, HDD video upload, etc.) and Remote Play.

When no modes are selected, Mainichi Issho runs in autoplay and becomes a traditional artificial life game. Then Toro interacts with available items or do "ordinary" actions such as dancing, cleaning his apartment, reading, playing, phoning, drinking milk from his fridge, sleeping, or going to the toilet (from where he reads a newspaper). Since the game is performed in real time, these actions can vary with the time of the day or the night. New actions are added as new version updates or items become available.

Main menu modes are listed as following:

ToroStation

The ToroStation (トロ･ステーション) delivers a semi-interactive blog-like daily news in a parody of the NHK Daily News show. News are presented with humor by Toro and Kuro in the manzai duet tradition.

 : daily updated blog-like news regarding general interests from upcoming games to cooking, to special event reports, or interviews. 10 and more  points are charged at the end of each issue. Some news include quiz test or mini-games, a correct answer would unlock exclusive game items (see Mochimono) or give some bonus Myaile points. Since August 2007, users are able to rate ToroStation news as on a regular blog.
 : a selection of recorded news listed by month releases.
 
 : list of websites highlighted in some news.

Nyavatar
Nyavatar (ニャバター) is a portmanteau of "nya", the Japanese cat scream (the equivalent of "meow") and "avatar" intended as the alternate identity used to personify someone on the Internet.

A Nyavatar is the user's alter-ego inside the game. Creating a nyavatar is free of charge, but clothes (cosplay) and extra accessories are purchased with real money (yen) through the Mainichi Issho Store.

Mochimono
Mochimono (もちもの) or "personal effects" is the place for items related actions. 
Presents (おくりもの, okurimono):
Rearranging (もようがえ, moyougae): allows to rearrange Toro's apartment furniture and interior decoration.
Cosplay (コスプレ, kosupure): to select and preview Toro's purchased cosplay suits.
Television (テレビ, terebi): this options allows various settings including RSS and BGM selection from the user's own compatible audio files (MP3, WMA, WAV, etc.) stored in the PlayStation 3's HDD.

Okaimono
Okaimono (おかいもの) is the place for shopping game items. Purchased items can be used or send to a friend.
Mainichi Store (まいにちいっしょSTORE): the Mainichi Store contains various content for purchase, items include several cosplay suits for Toro. A certain sum of Yen in the wallet and a proper "license" is needed to view and buy the Mainichi Store contents.
Myaile Shop (みャイルショップ): a store with free content only. It primarily consists of food for Toro, interior decoration items, and roulette tickets. Prices are based on the Myaile virtual money. Myaile are obtained by Toro in the ToroStation mode.

Game
Besides ToroStation occasional mini-games there are three full mini-games (ゲーム).
Mainichi Right Brain Ranking (まいにち右脳ランキング): this IQ test mini-games solo mode is based on Internet ranking.
Mainichi Right Brain Battle (まいにち右脳バトル): an online versus battle IQ test with level ranking and stats. Nyavatar feature is available in this mode (see Nyavatar).
Mainichi Picture guessing battle: First, you'll get a Japanese letter. Then you'll have to pick one of the pictures, with that thing that starts with the letter you got. You are also given 3 hints, which you can use if you don't know which to choose.
Mainichi Game Station (Nekone Club):
A game center, where you can buy 'medals' to play on the arcade machines there. You can either buy 10 for 100 yen, or 60 for 500 yen. Each game costs 1 medal to play.

Friend
Selecting "Friend" (フレンド) allows online communication with other users, including written messages and chat through the XMB standard feature. It is also possible to send presents, Mainichi Issho items, to be used in a friend's game.

PSP Version
Later in 2008, a PSP version was released on the PlayStation Store. It's just like the PS3 version, The only exception is that you can download a free costume mini-game.

Remote Play
Mainichi Issho is part of the PlayStation 3 games which are playable on the PlayStation Portable handheld console through Remote Play streaming function. "Game" mode is not compatible with Remote Play though.

Video Camera
Since Mainichi Issho's May update that coincides with the PlayStation 3 firmware 2.35 release, it is now possible to record an in-game video to save it on the console's HDD or to upload it on YouTube.

A similar older feature allows in-game screen capture (24 pieces for one game session in two resolutions: 640x360 and 480x272 pixels).

Updates

Version updates
Free version updates (バージョンアップ, "version up") adding contents such as new game modes are periodically released through in-game automatic download. 
Version 1: the original version was released on November 11, 2006.
Version 2: December 12, 2006. Adds ToroStation archives and Mainichi Right Brain Ranking mini-game.
Version 3: June 2007.
Version 4: September 28, 2007.
Version 5: October 11, 2007. It adds Nyavatar feature.
Version 6: January 2008. Adds option to interact with Nyavatar and Toro in a small yard outside their home.
Version X: May 2008. Adds YouTube upload.
Version X: September 18, 2008. Adds Trophies support.
Version X: 14 November 2008. Sleeping mode added. Toro sleeps at the nights.

Version 7

Game Station added. You can buy so called 'medals' here from a big machine to play on the featured Arcade machines, which contains different cosplay games to play. Normally, the price is 2 medals for one try.

10 medals (100 Yen)
60 medals (500 Yen)

There is also Gashapon machines there (Capsule toys) with several items inside, like signs, figurines and cat statues. Later, a Disgaea 2 portable capsule toy machine were added. 5 Medals for one, and they contain several "Panels".

Nyavatar Fashion show were also added in this update. You can use your Nyavatar to join a fashion contest, and be seen by other players visiting there. You can control your own moves too. A new contest also started.

Notes

External links
Mainichi Issho official website
Mainichi Issho official Game Guide

2006 video games
Casual games
Life simulation games
PlayStation 3-only games
PlayStation Network games
Sony Interactive Entertainment games
Japan-exclusive video games
PlayStation 3 games
Video games about cats
Video games developed in Japan
Game Arts games
Multiplayer and single-player video games